Every year along the Mississippi River levee near the town of Lutcher, Louisiana, over a hundred bonfires are built out of wood, firecrackers, and occasionally bamboo, said to have begun in the late 1800s. This tradition has often occurred on Christmas Eve. In case of rain, it is often rescheduled to New Year's Eve.

Story around the tradition says that the bonfires were made to light a path for Papa Noel. Others have explained the bonfire tradition as being for the purpose of helping friends of the family find the inlets or slips coming off the river to the homes of those they wanted to visit on Christmas Eve.

In 2020, the Christmas bonfires were cancelled due to the ongoing COVID-19 pandemic.

References

Tourist attractions in St. James Parish, Louisiana
Louisiana culture
Christmas events and celebrations